Azygophleps ganzelkozikmundi is a moth in the family Cossidae. It is found in Cameroon and the Democratic Republic of the Congo.

References

Moths described in 2009
Azygophleps